Ponomaryov, also spelled Ponomariov or Ponomarev, or Ponomaryova (feminine; Пономарёва) is a  Russian language patronymic surname derived from the nickname Ponomar ("sexton"), and literally meaning "sexton's son". The nickname "Ponomar" has also become a surname. The Ukrainian language counterpart is "Ponomarenko".

Notable people with the surname include:

Ponomarev
 Aleksandr Ponomarev (1918–1973), choir conductor
 Alexander Evgenievich Ponomarev, (b. 1957) Russian painter
 Anton Ponomarev (b. 1988), Kazakh basketball player
 Boris Ponomarev (1905–1995), Soviet politician and ideologist
 Dmitry Ponomarev (businessman) (b. 1960), Russian entrepreneur
 Ilya Ponomarev (b. 1975), Russian politician
 Sergey Ponomarev (b. 1956), Russian football player
 Sergey Ponomarev (photographer) (b. 1980), Russian photographer
 Valery Ponomarev (b. 1943), American-Russian jazz trumpeter
 Vyacheslav Ponomarev (b. 1978), Uzbek footballer

Ponomariov
 Ruslan Ponomariov (b. 1983), Ukrainian chess player and former FIDE world champion

Ponomaryov 
 Alexander Ponomaryov (1876–1941), Russian revolutionary
 Alexander Ponomaryov (1765–1831), Russian actor 
 Arkady Ponomaryov (b. 1956), Russian politician
 Igor Ponomaryov, (b. 1960), Soviet football player and manager
 Lev Ponomaryov (b. 1941), Russian politician and human rights activist
 Maksim Ponomaryov (b. 1980), Russian cosmonaut
 Nikolai Ponomaryov (1918-1997), Soviet graphic artist
 Oleksandr Ponomaryov (b. 1973), Ukrainian singer
 Pavel Andreyevich Ponomaryov (1844–1883), Russian vice consul in Hankow and philanthropist 
 Pavel Ivanovich Ponomaryov (1903–1944), Soviet army officer and Hero of the Soviet Union
 Pavel Yelizarovich Ponomaryov (1904–1973), Soviet army officer and Hero of the Soviet Union
 Prokopiy Ponomaryov (1774–1853), Russian entrepreneur, public figure, and philanthropist 
 Pyotr Ponomaryov (1924–1943), Soviet soldier and Hero of the Soviet Union
 Sergei Ponomaryov (b. 1953), Russian football coach and player
 Sergei Ponomaryov (officer) (1906–1991), Soviet army officer and Hero of the Soviet Union
 Vasili Ponomaryov (b. 2002), Russian ice hockey player
Yury Ivanovich Ponomaryov (1946–2020), Russian politician
Yury Anatolyevich Ponomaryov (1932–2005), Soviet cosmonaut
Yury Valentinovich Ponomaryov (b. 1946), Russian banker
Ponomaryova
 Anna Ponomaryova (1920–2009), Soviet fencer
 Larisa Ponomaryova (b. 1949), Russian politician 
 Margarita Ponomaryova (b. 1963), Russian hurdler 
 Nina Ponomaryova (1929–2016), Russian discus thrower 
 Valentina Ponomaryova (b. 1933), Soviet cosmonaut
 Valentina Ponomaryova (singer) (b. 1939), Russian jazz singer

Russian-language surnames
Patronymic surnames